The village Muramalla is a major panchayat located in the I. Polavaram Mandal of the East Godavari district of Andhra Pradesh.

References

Villages in East Godavari district